Texas University or t.u. is a name for the University of Texas at Austin, sometimes used in a derogatory manner by students at Texas A&M University.

Texas University may also refer to:
Southwestern University in Georgetown, Texas, which used the name Texas University from 1872 to 1875
Texas College in Tyler, Texas
Texas State University in San Marcos, Texas

See also
List of colleges and universities in Texas